Xinggu Subdistrict is a subdistrict on the center of Pinggu District, Beijing, China. It shares border with Shandongzhuang Town in the northeast, Xiagezhuang Town in the southeast, Pinggu Town and Binhe Subdistrict in the south, and Wangxinzhuang Town in the northwest. The subdistrict had 61,949 people residing under its administration according to the 2020 census. This subdistrict was created from part of Pinggu Town in 2002, and the name Xinggu literally means “Flourish Grain".

Administrative divisions 
So far in 2021, Xinggu Subdistrict consists of 15 subdivisions, where 12 of them are communities and 3 of them are villages. They are named in the following list:

See also 

 List of township-level divisions of Beijing

References 

Pinggu District
Subdistricts of Beijing